Sheykh Fandi (also Romanized as Sheykh Fandī) is a village in Hoseynabad Rural District, in the Central District of Shush County, Khuzestan Province, Iran. At the 2006 census, its population was 804, in 133 families.

References 

Populated places in Shush County